Colombian may refer to:

 Something of, from, or related to the country of Colombia
 Colombians, persons from Colombia, or of Colombian descent
For more information about the Colombian people, see:
 Demographics of Colombia
 Indigenous peoples in Colombia, Native Colombians
 Colombian American
 For specific persons, see List of Colombians
 Colombian Spanish, one of the languages spoken in Colombia
 See also languages of Colombia
 Colombian culture
 Colombian sheep, a sheep breed

See also 

 
 
 Christopher Columbus (1451–1506), Italian explorer after which Colombia was named 
 Coffee production in Colombia
 Colombia (disambiguation)
 Colombiana (disambiguation)
 Colombina (disambiguation) 
 Colombino (disambiguation) 
 Colombine (disambiguation)
 Columbia (disambiguation)
 Columbiad (disambiguation) 
 Columbian (disambiguation)
 Columbiana (disambiguation)
 Columbine (disambiguation) 
 Columbina (disambiguation) 

Language and nationality disambiguation pages